Loaf of Bread Butte is a summit in Custer County, Montana, in the United States.

References

Mountains of Custer County, Montana
Mountains of Montana